Zeta Boötis, Latinized from ζ Boötis, is a binary star system in the constellation of Boötes. They have the Flamsteed designation 30 Boötis; Zeta Boötis is the Bayer designation. This system is visible to the naked eye with a combined apparent magnitude of +3.78. The individual magnitudes differ slightly, with component A having a magnitude of 4.46 and component B at the slightly dimmer magnitude 4.55. It is located at a distance of approximately 180 light years from the Sun based on parallax, but is drifting closer with a radial velocity of −9 km/s.

The duplicity of this star was discovered by English astronomer William Herschel in 1796, and their changing positions have been tracked from 1823 onward. They complete an orbit roughly every . The orbit of this pair has a very high eccentricity of 0.9977, bringing the stars within 0.3 AU at their closest approach. The next close approach will occur during August 2023.

In 1976, T. W. Edwards found a stellar classification of A2III for both components, suggesting they may be evolved A-type giant stars. Helmut A. Abt reported a class of A2V in 1981, which matches an A-type main-sequence star. Abt and Nidia Morrell updated the classification to A1V in 1995. Considering the extreme nature of their orbit, it is unlikely that any companion exoplanets could have stable orbits around either star.

Gallery

References

External links
 
 HR 5477
 Image Zeta Boötis
 CCDM J14411+1344

A-type giants
A-type main-sequence stars
Binary stars

Boötes
Bootis, Zeta
BD+14 2770
Bootis, 30
129246 7
071795
5478
Astronomical objects discovered in 1796